James or Jim Jeffries may refer to:

 James Jeffries (Louisiana politician) (1807–1898), Louisiana Lt. Governor
 James Edmund Jeffries (1925–1997), Kansas congressman
 James J. Jeffries (1875–1953), boxing champion
 Jim Jeffries (baseball)

See also
 Jim Jefferies (disambiguation)
 James Franklin Jeffrey, American diplomat